Mueang Chiang Mai is the capital district (amphoe mueang) of Chiang Mai province in northern Thailand. The district contains the city municipality of Chiang Mai and is part of the Chiang Mai urban area (population: 1.2 million).

History
The area of Mueang Chiang Mai district was the central part of the Lanna Kingdom, named Nopphaburi Si Nakhon Phing Chiang Mai. King Mengrai the Great was the first king of the Mengrai dynasty, who established the city.

The government created Mueang Chiang Mai district in 1899. The first district office was opened in 1929, on the west side of the old city hall of Chiang Mai. A new district office was opened in August 1989.

Geography
Neighboring districts are (from the north clockwise) Mae Rim, San Sai, San Kamphaeng, Saraphi and Hang Dong.

The main river through the district is the Ping River.

Administration

Central administration 
Mueang Chiang Mai is divided into 16 sub-districts (tambon), which are further subdivided into 78 administrative villages (muban).

Local administration 
There is one city municipality (thesaban nakhon) in the district:
 Chiang Mai consisting of sub-districts Si Phum, Phra Sing, Haiya, Chang Moi, Chang Khlan, Wat Ket, Pa Tan, and parts of sub-districts Chang Phueak, Suthep, Pa Daet, Nong Hoi, Tha Sala, Nong Pa Khrang, Fa Ham.

There is one town-municipality (thesaban mueang) in the district:
 Mae Hia consisting of sub-district Mae Hia.

There are eight sub-district municipalities (thesaban tambons) in the district:
 Chang Phueak consisting of parts of sub-district Chang Phueak.
 Nong Pa Khrang consisting of parts of sub-district Nong Pa Khrang.
 Suthep consisting of parts of sub-district Suthep.
 Pa Daet consisting of parts of sub-district Pa Daet.
 Tha Sala consisting of parts of sub-district Tha Sala.
 Nong Hoi consisting of parts of sub-district Nong Hoi.
 Fa Ham consisting of parts of sub-district Fa Ham.
 San Phi Suea consisting of sub-district San Phi Suea.

There is one sub-district administrative organization (SAO) in the district:
 Chang Phueak consisting of parts of sub-district Chang Phueak.

References

External links
amphoe.com on Mueang Chiang Mai District (2022-04-15 Not working)

Chiang Mai province
Mueang Chiang Mai